Meant to Be may refer to:

 Meant to Be (John Scofield album), 1991
 Meant to Be (Selwyn album), 2002
 "Meant to Be" (Bebe Rexha song), 2017
 "Meant to Be" (Sammy Kershaw song), 1996
 Meant to Be (TV series), a 2017 Philippine television drama series
 Meant to Be, a 2012 film starring Dean Cain

See also
 Meant to Beh, a 2017 Philippine film